Allan Arkush (born April 30, 1948) is an American director and producer of films, television and videos. He is a collaborator of Joe Dante.

Early life
Arkush grew up in Fort Lee, New Jersey. He graduated in 1966 from Fort Lee High School. His experiences there served as the inspiration for the film Rock 'n' Roll High School (1979). He attended New York University Film School from 1967 to 1970. Septuagenarian Substitute Ball, his senior film, starring John Ford Noonan, won third prize at the National Student Film Festival-1970. His teacher and faculty adviser was Martin Scorsese "whose knowledge and passion changed my life". While at NYU, he worked at The Fillmore East as an usher, stage crew member and in the psychedelic light show "Joe's Lights", performing with artists including The Who, Grateful Dead, Santana, Allman Bros, Miles Davis, Indianapolis Symphony Orchestra, Virgil Fox and Fleetwood Mac in New York City and London.

He returned to New York City in 1973 where he drove a taxi. He moved to Los Angeles on October 4, 1973. He got his start in the film industry working (with the assistance of Jon Davison and Jonathan Kaplan) in the trailer department for Roger Corman's New World Pictures, where he met Dante. They cut trailers and TV spots for Death Race 2000, Crazy Mama, Amarcord, TNT Jackson, Small Change, Eat My Dust and at least 100 others. He co-directed Corman-produced films Hollywood Boulevard, Deathsport, was second-unit director on Grand Theft Auto for Ron Howard, and directed Rock 'n' Roll High School, starring The Ramones. At this point, as Corman said "If you do a good job, you never have to work for me again".

Feature films that followed include the dud Heartbeeps and the cult favorite Get Crazy and Caddyshack II. His music videos for Dokken, Elvis Costello, Christine McVie and Bette Midler/Mick Jagger earned five MTV nominations.

He directed several TV series, including Fame and St. Elsewhere. He directed 12 episodes of Moonlighting and received an Emmy nomination for "I Am Curious ... Maddie," the series's highest-rated episode. He directed 15 TV pilots and sold 10. The most successful was Crossing Jordan (director/executive producer), which lasted 117 episodes. He directed 250 TV episodes and produced another 200.

His TV work includes The Temptations, for which he received nominations for an Emmy Award and DGA; Ally McBeal (the "Dancing Baby" episode, yielding another Emmy nomination); Shake, Rattle and Rock! (the prequel to Rock n Roll High School); and Elvis Meets Nixon. He directed Young at Heart with Olympia Dukakis and Frank Sinatra. He was the director/executive producer of the TV series Heroes. He directed 11 episodes, including "Second Coming", which won the Emmy for best special effects.

Other highlights include Nashville and Hellcats, which he directed and acted as the executive producer for the pilot series. His most recent work is A Series of Unfortunate Events for which he received a DGA Nomination and Another Life, both for Netflix.

Arkush contributes commentary to the web series Trailers from Hell.

He is a member of the DGA Mentor Program, and teaches the Narrative Workshop at the American Film Institute.

He has been married for 38 years to Joanne Palace Arkush, and they have two daughters: Allison and Jacqueline.

Filmography
Hollywood Boulevard (co-directed with Joe Dante) (1976)
Grand Theft Auto (1977) (uncredited) – Clown
Deathsport (1978)
Rock 'n' Roll High School (1979)
Heartbeeps (1981)
Get Crazy (1983)
Caddyshack II (1988)
Shake, Rattle and Rock! (1994)
Young at Heart (1995)
Elvis Meets Nixon (1997)
The Temptations (1998)
Prince Charming (2001)

Television
Fame (1984–1986)
The Twilight Zone (1986)
L.A. Law (1986)
St. Elsewhere (1986–1987)
Moonlighting (1986–1989)
Tattingers (1988)
Capital News (1990)
Parenthood (1990–1991)
Shannon's Deal (1990–1991)
Middle Ages (1992)
Mann & Machine (1992)
The Bronx Zoo (1987)
Bodies of Evidence (1992)
I'll Fly Away (1992–1993)
Johnny Bago (1993)
Sirens (1993)
Moon Over Miami (1993)
Rebel Highway (1994)
Shake, Rattle and Rock! (1994)
Central Park West (1995–1996)
Dangerous Minds (1996)
Timecop (1997)
Total Security (1997)
The Visitor (1997)
Players (1997)
Dawson's Creek (1998)
The Temptations (1998)
Ally McBeal (1998–1999)
The Practice (1999)
Snoops (1999–2000)
Bull (2000)
Tucker (2000)
Go Fish (2001)
Crossing Jordan (2001–2007)
Heroes (2006–2010)
Melrose Place (2009)
Mercy (2009)
White Collar (2009)
Hellcats (2010)
Life Unexpected (2010)
Ringer (2011–2012)
Franklin & Bash (2012)
Christmas with Holly (2012)
The Client List (2012–2013)
Witches of East End (2013–2014)
Defiance (2014–2015)
Switched at Birth (2014–2017)
Dig (2015)
Salem (2015)
Minority Report (2015)
Heroes Reborn (2015)
CSI: Cyber (2015)
BrainDead (2016)
NCIS (2016)
No Tomorrow (2016)
The Good Fight (2017)
Nashville (2017–2018)
A Series of Unfortunate Events (2018)
Another Life (2019)

References

External links

1948 births
Living people
American television directors
Comedy film directors
People from Fort Lee, New Jersey
Artists from Jersey City, New Jersey
Primetime Emmy Award winners
Film directors from New Jersey
Fort Lee High School alumni
Television producers from New Jersey